Sarah Wilkes (born August 4, 1990, in Toronto, Ontario) is a Canadian curler from London, Ontario. She won the 2019 Scotties Tournament of Hearts with Team Chelsea Carey and is currently the second for Team Rachel Homan.

Career

Juniors
As a junior curler, Wilkes played third for the 2011 Ontario Junior Women's Championship team skipped by Clancy Grandy. The team represented Ontario at the 2011 Canadian Junior Curling Championships, where they finished with a 5–7 record.

In University curling, Wilkes played third for the Wilfrid Laurier University women's curling team. She played in the 2010 CIS/CCA Curling Championships on a team skipped by Danielle Inglis, losing in the semi-final. Laurier would then win the 2011 and 2012 CIS/CCA Curling Championships under skip Laura Crocker. The team represented Canada at the 2013 Winter Universiade, but they finished off the podium with a 4–5 round robin record.

Women's
After university, Wilkes and Crocker moved to Alberta. They would play in the 2013 Alberta Scotties Tournament of Hearts, losing in the semifinal. The next season, Wilkes joined the Kristie Moore rink. Wilkes was invited to join the Alberta team, skipped by Val Sweeting at the 2015 Scotties Tournament of Hearts. The team would lose in the final.

Wilkes joined the Shannon Kleibrink rink in 2015 at second position. In their first season, the team would win the Medicine Hat Charity Classic and play in the 2016 Alberta Scotties Tournament of Hearts, where they narrowly missed the playoffs when they lost the final qualification game. The next season they would go on to win the 2017 Alberta Scotties Tournament of Hearts, earning the right to represent Alberta at the 2017 Scotties Tournament of Hearts. At the hearts, the team finished with a 5–6 record, failing to qualify for the playoffs. In 2018 Wilkes lost the Alberta Jiffy Lube Scotties final to Casey Scheidegger 7–6 in an extra end.

After the season, Wilkes joined the Carey team including Chelsea Carey, Dana Ferguson and Rachelle Brown, playing out of The Glencoe Club in Calgary. Leading up to Alberta provincials, the team had two playoff appearances at Grand Slam of Curling events including a semifinal finish at the Masters. Team Carey qualified for the 2019 Alberta Scotties Tournament of Hearts as the CTRS leaders from the tour season. They qualified for the playoffs as the "A Qualifier" after defeating Casey Scheidegger's rink 7–2. They defeated the Kelsey Rocque rink in the A vs. B playoff game 10–2 and would go on to beat them in the final 8–3 after Carey made a double for four in the ninth end. Representing Alberta at the 2019 Scotties Tournament of Hearts, they went 7–0 through the round robin and finished the championship pool with a 9–2 record which made them the number one seed going into the playoffs. Alberta defeated Saskatchewan's Robyn Silvernagle rink in the 1 vs. 2 game 11–7 and would face Ontario's Rachel Homan rink in the final. Team Carey made history when they came back from a 1–5 deficit to win the championship 8–6 with a total of five stolen points and two missed draws by Homan in the 10th and 11th ends. At the 2019 World Women's Curling Championship, the team struggled and were the first Canadian women's team not to make the playoffs at the championship in twenty years. They finished the season with a quarterfinal finish at the 2019 Players' Championship and by missing the playoffs at the 2019 Champions Cup.

Team Carey did not have a strong start to the Grand Slam season, only making the playoffs at one of the first four events, the National. They had a strong week at the 2019 Canada Cup going 4–2 through the round robin, qualifying for the playoffs. In the semifinal, they lost to the Tracy Fleury rink 9–4. At the 2020 Scotties Tournament of Hearts, Team Carey led Team Canada to a 5–6 record, missing the playoffs and settling for seventh place. It would be the team's last event of the season as both the Players' Championship and the Champions Cup Grand Slam events were cancelled due to the COVID-19 pandemic. On March 13, 2020, Wilkes announced she would be parting ways with the team. Three days later, Ferguson and Brown announced they would be leaving and the team officially disbanded. On March 17, 2020, Team Rachel Homan announced that Wilkes would be joining the team with the departure of Lisa Weagle. Wilkes would play second, with Joanne Courtney moving to lead and Emma Miskew playing third. Wilkes previously spared for the team at the 2017 Humpty's Champions Cup Grand Slam where they won the event.

Homan's team was chosen to represent Ontario at the 2021 Scotties Tournament of Hearts in Calgary. Up to that point, they had only played in one tour game the entire season in the Okotoks Ladies Classic in November, before that event was cancelled due to a province-wide shutdown in Alberta. At the Scotties, they had a successful round robin, with a 7–1 record, including a win against defending champion Kerri Einarson. They entered the championship pool as the first seed, where they won three games and lost one to Manitoba's Jennifer Jones. Because of their earlier win against Einarson, Homan's team received a bye to the final. There, they lost 9–7 to Einarson after Homan missed a freeze in the last end, resulting in Einarson not needing to throw her last rock. Team Homan returned to the bubble in April 2021 to play in the two only Grand Slam events of the abbreviated season. At the first Slam, the 2021 Champions Cup, the team defeated Silvana Tirinzoni to win the event. A week later, they played in the 2021 Players' Championship, where they lost in the final to Team Einarson in a re-match of the Scotties final.

Team Homan made it to the quarterfinals of their first slam of the year, the 2021 Masters, where they were beaten by Alina Kovaleva. Two weeks later, they played in the 2021 National, where they were eliminated in the quarters again, this time by Anna Hasselborg. Next for Team Homan was the 2021 Canadian Olympic Curling Trials where they attempted to qualify for the Olympics again. The team, however, did not have a successful week, finishing with a 2–6 record. Team Homan's record over the season was not good enough to give them an automatic qualifying spot at the 2022 Ontario Scotties Tournament of Hearts, forcing them to play in an open qualifier. The team did qualify at the Open Qualifier, but the Ontario Scotties were postponed due to new COVID-19 regulations put into place by the province, shutting down sports event. With the postponement of the Ontario Scotties, CurlON announced that they would be selecting Team Hollie Duncan over Team Homan to represent Ontario if Homan was selected to represent Canada in the mixed doubles event at the 2022 Olympics (as the Trials had been cancelled). However, if Homan wasn't selected, then CurlON would select Team Homan to play in the Scotties instead. This plan of action was considered confusion and disappointing to the teams involved. Homan would end up being selected to represent Canada at the Olympics, giving Team Duncan the right to represent Ontario at the 2022 Scotties. However, the rest of Team Homan qualified for the Scotties as Team Wild Card #3. For the Tournament of Hearts, Wilkes, Emma Miskew and Joanne Courtney added Allison Flaxey to their lineup. At the championship, the team finished with a 4–4 round robin record, not advancing to the playoff round. Team Homan had to wait until April 2022 to play in the postponed Ontario Hearts, which they ended up winning, beating Carly Howard in the final. The team wrapped up their season with the two final slams, making it to the semifinals at the 2022 Players' Championship where they lost to Anna Hasselborg, and the quarters of the 2022 Champions Cup, where they lost to Kerri Einarson. In March 2022, after Joanne Courtney announced she would be stepping back from competitive curling, it was announced that Tracy Fleury would be joining the team for the 2022–23 season. With the addition of Fleury on the back-end, Miskew shifted down to play second while Wilkes moved to the lead position.

Mixed
Wilkes played third for the Mick Lizmore-skipped Alberta team at the 2016 Canadian Mixed Curling Championship. The team would win the event. They represented Canada at the 2016 World Mixed Curling Championship, where they lost in the quarterfinal.

Personal life
Wilkes' hometown is Scarborough, Ontario, where she attended Birchmount Park Collegiate Institute. She also played softball while attending Laurier University. She is married to Mick Lizmore is qualifying to be a registered psychotherapist.

Teams

References

External links

1990 births
Living people
Canadian women curlers
Canadian schoolteachers
Wilfrid Laurier University alumni
Curlers from Edmonton
Sportspeople from London, Ontario
Sportspeople from Scarborough, Toronto
Curlers from Toronto
Canadian women's curling champions
Canadian mixed curling champions
Continental Cup of Curling participants
Canada Cup (curling) participants
20th-century Canadian women
21st-century Canadian women